Ratu George Cakobau Jr., also known as Ratu Jioji Cakobau (died June 25, 2018) was a Fijian chief and political leader. He was the eldest son of the late Governor-General, Ratu Sir George Cakobau, who was also the Vunivalu of Bau (widely considered to be Fiji's most senior chiefly position), and was a great-great grandson of Seru Epenisa Cakobau, the warlord who established the first unified Fijian Kingdom in 1871 and ceded it to the United Kingdom in 1874.

A meeting of elders from the Tui Kaba clan, to which he belonged, tentatively proposed him as the next Vunivalu in June 2005. The position has been vacant since the death of his father in 1989, owing to disagreements over the succession.

In 2001, Cakobau was appointed to the Senate by the Great Council of Chiefs, having been nominated by the Tailevu Provincial Council. He served until 2006.

References

External links

Year of birth missing
20th-century births
2018 deaths
Fijian chiefs
I-Taukei Fijian members of the Senate (Fiji)
Tui Kaba
Politicians from Bau (island)